The Church of the Holy Cross at Soradir is a 6th-century Armenian monastic complex in south-eastern Turkey. It is situated in the village of Yanal near the town and district of Başkale in Van Province.

History 
The Monastery of the Holy Cross at Soradir or Dzoradir was built in the 6th century by the apprentice of the architect of the Saint Bartholomew Monastery; the site corresponds to a settlement in the Metz Aghbak district of Vaspurakan province of historical Armenia. According to Armenian inscriptions found inside the main church, in 582 with the sponsorship of Saro Mahtesi the church's dome and western threshold were reconstructed. In the 10th century, the Armenian king Gurgen III Artzruni entrusted the architect Manuel to build the Saint Cross of Akhtamar monastery copying the design of the Dzoradir monastery. It was a functioning Armenian monastery until the Armenian genocide in 1915.

Current condition 
After the Armenian genocide, the monastery has sat in an abandoned state, and only one graffitied and derelict church building remains extant.

References

Armenian Apostolic churches in Turkey
Christian monasteries established in the 6th century
Former churches in Turkey
Former religious buildings and structures in Turkey
Buildings and structures in Van Province
Vaspurakan
Demolished buildings and structures in Turkey
Destroyed churches in Turkey
Churches destroyed by Muslims
Armenian buildings in Turkey